Malcolm Taylor (born 1960) is an American former professional football player.

Malcolm Taylor may also refer to:

Malcolm Taylor (cricketer) (1904–1978), English cricketer
Malcolm Campbell Taylor (1832–1922), Scottish minister and professor
Malcolm McDowell (born Malcolm Taylor; 1943), British actor, producer, and television presenter

See also
Malcolm Cartwright-Taylor (1911–1969), British Royal Marines officer